Galina Gavrilovna Yershova, or Ershova (born 17 March 1955) is a Russian academic historian, linguist, and epigrapher, who specialises in the study of the ancient civilisations, cultures, and languages of the New World. As an Americanist scholar, her area of expertise is in the field of Mesoamerican studies, and in particular that of the pre-Columbian Maya civilisation, its historical literature, and its writing system. Yershova is a former student and protégé of the Russian linguist and epigrapher Yuri Knorozov, renowned for his central contributions towards the decipherment of the Maya script.

, Yershova is a senior fellow at the Russian Academy of Sciences' Institute of Archaeology at the Russian State University for the Humanities (RGGU), and director of the RGGU's Centre for Mesoamerican Research. She has authored approximately two hundred papers in scientific, art, and literature publications, including some eight monographs on Maya writing, history, and archaeoastronomy.

References

External links
 Sesenta años descifrando la escritura maya Conference by Galina Yershova in the Museo Popol Vuh of the Universidad Francisco Marroquín of Guatemala

1955 births
Living people
20th-century Russian historians
Russian women historians
Linguists from Russia
Women linguists
Russian Mesoamericanists
Women Mesoamericanists
Historians of Mesoamerica
Mesoamerican epigraphers
Mayanists
20th-century Mesoamericanists
21st-century Mesoamericanists
21st-century Russian historians